Clipper is an xBase compiler that implements a variant of the xBase computer programming language. It is used to create 
or extend software programs that originally operated primarily under MS-DOS. Although it is a powerful general-purpose programming
language, it was primarily used to create database/business programs.
 
One major dBase feature  not implemented in Clipper is the dot-prompt (. prompt) interactive command set, which was an important part of the original dBase implementation.

Clipper, from Nantucket Corp and later Computer Associates, started out as a native code compiler for dBase III databases, and later evolved.

History
Clipper was created by Nantucket Corporation, a company that was started in 1984 by Barry ReBell (management) and Brian Russell (technical); 
Larry Heimendinger was Nantucket's president. In 1992, the company was sold to Computer Associates for 190 million dollars and the product was renamed to CA-Clipper.

Clipper was created as a replacement programming language for Ashton Tate's dBASE III, a very popular database language at the time. The advantage of Clipper over dBASE was that it could be compiled and executed under MS-DOS as a standalone application. In the years between 1985 and 1992, millions of Clipper applications were built, typically for small businesses dealing with databases concerning many aspects of client management and inventory management. For many smaller businesses, having a Clipper application designed to their specific needs was their first experience with software development. Also a lot of applications for banking and insurance companies were developed, here especially in those cases where the application was considered too small to be developed and run on traditional mainframes. In these environments Clipper also served as a front end for existing mainframe applications.

As the product matured, it remained a DOS tool for many years, but added elements of the C programming language and Pascal programming language, as well as OOP, and the code-block data-type (hybridizing the concepts of dBase macros, or string-evaluation, and function pointers), to become far more powerful than the original. Nantucket's Aspen project later matured into the Windows native-code CA-Visual Objects compiler.

Market penetration
Nantucket sold well in Western markets.  Also, in November 1991, the New York Times reported the company's success in "painstakingly convincing Soviet software developers that buying is preferable to pirating".  According to the article, Clipper had sold 2,000 copies in the Soviet Union (compared to 250,000 worldwide).

Decline
In the early 1990s, under new ownership, Clipper failed to transition from MS-DOS to Microsoft Windows.  As a result, almost no new commercial applications were written in Clipper after 1995.

By then, the "classically trained programmer" commonly used strong typing, in contrast to the original dBASE language.
An evolution of Clipper, named VO, added strong typing but made it optional, in order to remain compatible with existing code.
Four of the more important languages that took over from Clipper were Visual Basic, Microsoft Access, Delphi, and Powerbuilder.
They all provided strong typing.

Revival by third-parties
The Clipper language is being actively implemented and extended by multiple organizations/vendors, like XBase++ from Alaska Software and FlagShip, as well as free (GPL-licensed) projects like Harbour and xHarbour.

Many of the current implementations are portable (DOS, Windows, Linux (32- and 64-bit), Unix (32- and 64-bit), and macOS), supporting many language extensions, and have greatly extended runtime libraries, as well as various Replaceable Database Drivers (RDD) supporting many popular database formats, like DBF, DBTNTX, DBFCDX (FoxPro, Apollo, Comix, and Advantage Database Server), MachSix (SIx Driver and Apollo), SQL, and more. These newer implementations all strive for full compatibility with the standard dBase/xBase syntax, while also offering OOP approaches and target-based syntax such as SQLExecute().

Usenet
The Clipper Usenet newsgroups are comp.lang.clipper and comp.lang.clipper.visual-objects.

Programming in Clipper 

A simple hello world - application:

 ? "Hello World!"

A simple data base input mask:

 USE Customer SHARED NEW
 clear
 @  1, 0 SAY "CustNum" GET Customer->CustNum PICT "999999" VALID Customer->CustNum > 0
 @  3, 0 SAY "Contact" GET Customer->Contact VALID !empty(Customer->Contact)
 @  4, 0 SAY "Address" GET Customer->Address
 READ

Version history 
The various versions of Clipper were

From Nantucket Corporation; the "seasonal versions", billed as "dBase compilers"

 Nantucket Clipper Winter'84 - released May 25, 1985
 Nantucket Clipper Summer'85 - released 1985
 Nantucket Clipper Winter'85 - released January 29, 1986
 Nantucket Clipper Autumn'86 - released October 31, 1986
 Nantucket Clipper Summer'87 - released December 21, 1987

From Nantucket Corporation; Clipper 5

 Nantucket Clipper 5.00         - released 1990
 Nantucket Clipper 5.01         - released April 15, 1991
 Nantucket Clipper 5.01 Rev.129 - released March 31, 1992

and from Computer Associates; CA-Clipper 5

 CA Clipper 5.01a -
 CA Clipper 5.20  - released February 15, 1993
 CA-Clipper 5.2a  - released March 15, 1993
 CA Clipper 5.2b  - released June 25, 1993
 CA-Clipper 5.2c  - released August 6, 1993
 CA Clipper 5.2d  - released March 25, 1994
 CA-Clipper 5.2e  - released February 7, 1995
 CA Clipper 5.30  - released June 26, 1995
 CA Clipper 5.3a  - released May 20, 1996
 CA Clipper 5.3b  - released May 20, 1997

Clipper tools 
In addition to the standard clipper library, a library named "Clipper Tools" was developed by CA after purchasing Nantucket.  Three versions of this library were released, alongside Clipper versions.  This library became a de facto standard amongst Clipper clones, such as xHarbour.  It was also cloned by several of Clipper's clones.

References

External links
Free Open Source Graphic,GUI & Form Designer for CA-Clipper
mini Clipper FAQ
Print from Clipper to newest Windows printers article
The Oasis is the largest file archive for CA-Clipper and xBase on the web
Harbour Project A 32/64 bit multiplatform Clipper compiler

1985 software
Fourth-generation programming languages
DOS software
Dynamic programming languages
Dynamically typed programming languages
High-level programming languages
Programming languages
Programming languages created in 1985
XBase programming language family